Apophatus parvus is a moth of the  family Palaephatidae. It was described by Donald R. Davis in 1986. It is found in the Valdivian forest zone of southern Chile.

The length of the forewings is about 3.8 mm for males and about 4 mm for females. Adults have uniformly fuscous wings. They are on wing in February in one generation per year.

Etymology
The specific name is derived from Latin parvus (meaning little) and refers to the small size of this species.

References

Moths described in 1986
Palaephatidae
Taxa named by Donald R. Davis (entomologist)
Endemic fauna of Chile